Huaso (1933 – August 24, 1961) was a horse that, ridden by Chilean Captain Alberto Larraguibel, set the high-jump world record on February 5, 1949, by jumping  in Viña del Mar, Chile, one of the longest-running unbroken sport records in history, at 70 years.

Huaso was born in Chile in 1933, and was originally named Faithful. He started as a race horse, but never achieved good results because he was too nervy and unruly. After six years of failure, the horse was purchased in the early 1940s by Chilean Army captain Gaspar Lueje, who thought he could be trained for Dressage. When Faithful was just starting his training he suffered an accident, impaling himself on the back quarter, and almost having to be put down. The horse eventually recovered, but acquired a slight limp in the left hind, which effectively put an end to any chances in that discipline.

As a last option he was moved to show jumping. Faithful still retained his potency, but nonetheless, he was still too nervy and difficult to control, and he wasn't showing any promise in jumping. One afternoon, while he was being trained riderless on the enclosure, he simply bolted and jumped over the surrounding wall, which was over 2 meters high. Casually, he was spotted by an Army horse master who happened to pass by, and who right away decided to purchase and destine him for high-jump.

The horse was then taken to the Army Cavalry Academy, in the city of Quillota. There, the name was changed to Huaso and he was handed to Captain Alberto Larraguibel for training. He trained the horse for over two years specifically for the world record. He first targeted the national record, then the South-American and finally, the world one.

On February 5, 1949, both rider and horse were finally ready. The attempts were held at the Coraceros Regiment in Viña del Mar, Chile. On the words of Captain Larraguibel:

When they broke the world record Huaso was already 16 years old, quite old for a result of that magnitude. After the record, the horse was retired and never ridden again. He roamed freely until he died naturally on August 24, 1961, at the age of 28. Huaso is buried on the same Cavalry Academy where he spent his last years.

Larraguibel & Huaso's commemorative monument in Vina del Mar is an impressive statue : a nude woman -Faith?- supports the leaping Horse. 
The commemorative plate reads As for me it was like sending my heart flying over the other side of the jump and then going to rescue it. (Larraguibel)

The High Jump world record should not be confused with the Puissance world record. The Puissance is a series of bricks built as a wall rather than angled poles as used in the high jump. The word 'Puissance' means 'power' in French.

See also
 List of historical horses

References

External links
Video of Huaso jumping the world record
Complete article on the jump and biography of "Huaso" 
Biography of "Huaso" 
Pictures
Chronology of high and long jump records
Video
Picture
50th Anniversary Commemorative Chilean Stamp

Show jumping horses
1949 in Chile
1933 animal births
1961 animal deaths
Individual male horses